Limonium sinuatum, commonly known as wavyleaf sea lavender, statice, sea lavender, notch leaf marsh rosemary, sea pink, is a Mediterranean plant species in the family Plumbaginaceae known for its papery flowers that can be used in dried arrangements.

It is native to the whole Mediterranean Basin. It usually grows up in sandy grounds.

Description
It is a short-lived perennial plant, and is often treated as an annual. All parts are downy. The flowers present in short, papery clusters in colours ranging from white to pink, purple, and yellow. It has been known to become invasive.

References

sinuatum
Garden plants of Europe
Drought-tolerant plants
Flora of Lebanon
Taxa named by Philip Miller
Flora of Malta